Prodoxus y-inversus is a moth of the family Prodoxidae. It is found in the United States in south-western New Mexico, south-eastern Arizona and southern Nevada. The habitat consists of shrubby desert and open forests.

The wingspan is 11–16 mm. The forewings are near white with dark brown bands, forming an inversed "Y" in the outer portion of the wing. These bands are lighter in males. The hindwings are pale brown. Adults are on wing from April to May.

The larvae feed on Yucca baccata and Yucca schottii. They feed in a gallery inside the fruit, and eventually create a hardened pupation gallery.

References

Moths described in 1892
Prodoxidae